My Place is an Australian children's television drama series based on the award-winning picture book of the same name by Nadia Wheatley and Donna Rawlins. The series first screened on ABC3 on weeknights at 8pm from 4 December 2009 and aired in the United States on Vibrant TV Network.

My Place is produced by Penny Chapman and directed by Jessica Hobbs, Samantha Lang, Catriona McKenzie, Michael James Rowland and Shawn Seet. The series was accompanied by an interactive website for children that allowed them to explore the house that is the series' main setting. It won the 2010 Logie Award for Best Children's Program.

On 23 March 2010 Screen Australia announced they approved funding for a second series which would focus on the lives of children and their families from the time period of 1878 to before the White Settlement. The first of thirteen episodes aired on 26 June 2011.

Synopsis 
My Place tells the story of one house in south Sydney as told by the generations of children who have lived there over a period of over 220 years. The series opens in 2008 and travels back to pre-1788. Each episode centres around a child with a talent for some kind of trouble, each hiding up the same old fig tree, each with a story to tell.

Cast

Children
 Joseph Ireland as Davey Jonesy
 Maddie Madden as Laura
 Narek Armaganian as Mohammed 
 Sheena Pham as Lily
 Will Cottle as Mike
 Anastasia Feneri as Sofia
 Jonathan Kollias as Michaelis
 Monique Holmes as Jen
 Alfred Carslake as Colum
 Holly Fraser as Bridie
 Shardyn Fahey-Leigh as Bertie
 Lucy Howroyd as Evelyn
 Benson Anthony as Rowley
 Eliza Saville as Victoria
 Jared Ziegler as Dan

Adults
 Leah Purcell as Ellen        
 Kiah Ferguson as (Ellen's daughter)
 Anita Hegh as Emma
 Wadih Dona as Omar
 Kris McQuade as Grandma
 Nicholas Papademetriou as Michaelis
 Victoria Haralabidou as Mama 
 Rebecca Massey as Mrs Benson
 Susie Porter as Miss Muller
 Emma Lung as Bridie
 Chris Haywood as Momo
 Dan Spielman
 Leon Ford 
 Sacha Horler
 Russell Dykstra 
 Dan Wyllie
 Tom Fisher as Dom Cobb
 Erol Cimen as Tyler Cromm
For other cast members see List of My Place (TV series) Episodes.

Episode list

Season One
 Laura 2008
 Mohammed 1998
 Lily 1988
 Mike 1978
 Sofia 1968
 Michaelis 1958
 Jen 1948
 Colum 1938
 Bridie 1928
 Bertie 1918
 Evelyn 1908
 Rowley 1898
 Victoria 1888

Season Two
 Henry 1878
 Minna 1868
 Ben 1858
 Johanna 1848
 Davey 1838
 Alice 1828
 Charles 1818
 Sarah 1808
 Sam 1798
 Dan 1788
 Waruwi 1788
 Bunda Before Time
 Barangaroo Before Time

References

External links 
 
 

2009 Australian television series debuts
2011 Australian television series endings
Australian drama television series
Australian Broadcasting Corporation original programming
Australian children's television series
Television shows set in New South Wales
Television series by Matchbox Pictures